Vom Schem Hamphoras, full title: Vom Schem Hamphoras und vom Geschlecht Christi (Of the Unknowable Name and the Generations of Christ), was a book written by German Reformation leader Martin Luther in 1543, in which he equated Jews with the Devil and described them in vile language.

Schem Hamphoras is the Hebrew rabbinic name for the ineffable name of God, the tetragrammaton. Luther's use of the term was in itself a taunt and insult to Jewish sensitivities. He wrote the 125-page text several months after publishing On the Jews and Their Lies.

In Hamphoras (pp. 34-35) he wrote:

Luther argued that the Jews were no longer the chosen people but "the devil's people". An English translation of Vom Schem Hamphoras was first published in 1992 as part of The Jew In Christian Theology by Gerhard Falk. Historians have noted Luther's writings contributed to antisemitism within the German provinces during his era. Historical evidence shows that the Nazi Party in the 1930s and 1940s used Luther's writings to build up antisemitism under their rule, by exerting pressure on schools to incorporate it into the curriculum, and the Lutheran church to incorporate it into sermons. Whether or not Luther's writings were a leading force for antisemitism in Europe over the past 500 years is currently being debated by historians. Nevertheless, it is clear that his writings were used extensively by the Nazis.

See also
 Judensau - the image of Jews in obscene contact with a large sow (female pig) which first appeared in the thirteenth century.
 Luther and antisemitism

References

1543 books
16th-century Christian texts
Works by Martin Luther
Antisemitic publications
Lutheranism and antisemitism